Altagonum avium is a species of ground beetle in the subfamily Carabinae. It was described by Darlington in 1951.

References

avium
Beetles described in 1951